Grim & Evil is an American animated television series created by Maxwell Atoms for Cartoon Network. It consists of two segments which were eventually spun off into their own series, The Grim Adventures of Billy & Mandy and Evil Con Carne.

The Grim Adventures of Billy & Mandy deals with the adventures of two young children respectively named Billy and Mandy who, after celebrating the birthday of Billy's pet hamster, bet that the Grim Reaper would lose to them in Limbo at his own game of limbo in an effort to save the hamster. Billy and Mandy win the bet, and Grim becomes their "best friend forever" as part of their deal.

Evil Con Carne follows the adventures of Hector Con Carne, a wealthy playboy whose body is destroyed in a tremendous explosion. His only surviving organs are his brain and stomach, which have been placed in jars and attached to a circus bear named Boskov.

The show premiered its run on August 24, 2001, on Cartoon Network, and ended its first 13-episode run on October 18, 2002. However, there was also another batch of 14 episodes made for the show, but were aired on Cartoon Network when the show was split into both shows in 2003. The second (and final) season of this era was aired in the UK on October 20, 2003.

History 
The series' existence is largely the result of a viewer poll. An Internet and call-in event called the Big Pick was held from June 16, to August 25, 2000. The three final choices were The Grim Adventures of Billy & Mandy, Whatever Happened to... Robot Jones?, Longhair and Doubledome. Out of the three, Grim & Evil won the poll with 57% of the vote and became its own series. The first season appeared on Cartoon Network to kick off the "Cartoon Cartoon Fridays Big Pick Weekend" on August 24, 2001. Whatever Happened to... Robot Jones? would later be made into a full (though short-lived) series despite losing; Longhair and Doubledome would reappear with another pilot episode in another Big Pick-style show in 2002, only to fall short once again. Along with Billy & Mandy, Atoms produced another short, Evil Con Carne, that would later be combined with the former as one show, under the title Grim & Evil. The decision came as Cartoon Network wanted the show to have a "middle cartoon" to air in-between the Billy & Mandy segments (similar to the Dial M For Monkey and The Justice Friends shorts in Dexter's Laboratory, or the I Am Weasel segments on Cow and Chicken). Sometimes the format was reversed, with a single Grim segment in between two Evil shorts. Both sides of the show were influenced by cartoons Atoms watched in the 1980s; Grim took inspiration from classic comedies from Hanna-Barbera and Warner Bros, while Evil was a spoof of the era's action cartoons such as G.I. Joe and Transformers.

In 2003, before the series aired in reruns for the final time on June 8, the network separated it into The Grim Adventures of Billy & Mandy and Evil Con Carne, effectively giving both a full-length series, despite the 2003 episodes originally made for Grim & Evil. The short-lived Evil Con Carne series was cancelled once all the already-made episodes previously seen on Grim & Evil were aired. In 2004, Evil Con Carne was given another short-lived run with the newly created intro and end credits, only to be canceled again. Grim & Evil, in its original form, has not been seen on TV since 2003. Evil Con Carnes Skarr became a recurring character on Billy and Mandy beginning in the second season, including as a main character in the TV film Underfist, with other Evil Con Carne characters making occasional cameo appearances.

On October 22, 2004, Cartoon Network aired the half-hour Billy & Mandy/Evil Con Carne combo: "Five-O-Clock Shadows" and "Ultimate Evil", with it being the final half-hour Grim & Evil episode.

The series began airing again in 2005 as part of the Cartoon Cartoon Show block on Cartoon Network, as well as the extra 13 episodes out of nowhere.

The series aired again in October 29, 2010, for the first time since the Cartoon Cartoon show airing, but the title sequence did not play at all and all of the cartoons were three Billy & Mandy cartoons from the Grim & Evil era. On October 20, 2017, all 26 episodes produced were released on Cartoon Network on Demand, including 13 other episodes made up of segments that aired as separated series, but put together in their original Grim & Evil format (two Billy & Mandy segments surrounding one Evil Con Carne, only this time, there are three cases where it is entirely Billy & Mandy). They were also listed on the website of The Detour on Teletoon in Canada. On January 8, 2019, Maxwell Atoms confirmed on Tumblr that these 13 extra episodes aired in the United States, but the dates that they aired on are still currently unknown, though it can be assumed that it would be sometime in 2002 and 2003, as the credits for each episode have copyright dates of those years.

Segments

The Grim Adventures of Billy & Mandy 

The Grim Adventures of Billy & Mandy is a series about two neighborhood kids, moronic yet enthusiastic Billy and emotionless Mandy who force the Grim Reaper to be their best friend forever after defeating the Messenger of Death in a game of Limbo. This is the main segment, as two The Grim Adventures of Billy & Mandy episodes are wrapped around an episode of Evil Con Carne (or, on rare episodes, vice versa). For episodes 21, 25, and 26, only the Grim half was shown.

Evil Con Carne 

Evil Con Carne is a series about an aspiring dictator obsessed with taking over the world, whose disembodied brain is transplanted onto the head of a slow-witted circus bear. This is usually the backup to The Grim Adventures of Billy & Mandy as Evil Con Carne is put between two The Grim Adventures of Billy & Mandy cartoons. On occasion, the format is reversed, with a two-part Evil Con Carne cartoon sandwiching one The Grim Adventures of Billy & Mandy cartoon. The Evil half was not shown in episodes 21, 25, or 26.

Episodes 

Note: The first season originally aired from 2001 to 2002. They were re-aired in 2003, when they were divided into both shows. Another batch of 14 episodes produced for the series in 2003 and 2004 only aired when they were divided into both shows. Despite which, the entirety of Grim & Evil is considered season one of both The Grim Adventures of Billy & Mandy (Grim segments) and Evil Con Carne (Evil segments).

Season 1 (2001–02)

Season 2 (2003–04) 
Note: A batch of fourteen Grim & Evil episodes premiered on Cartoon Network in the United States in 2003 and 2004 when The Grim Adventures of Billy & Mandy and Evil Con Carne were split into two half hour shows, but they were not made for the two standalone shows, as they were also made for the second season Grim & Evil in the UK in October 2003. Although not released officially in 2003 as episodes of the show, Maxwell Atoms confirmed that Cartoon Network erratic broadcast schedule, with the exceptions of Jacked-Up Halloween, Five O' Clock Shadows, and Ultimate Evil. They were, however, aired on various channels outside of the United States, including Canada's Teletoon Detour and France's Boing. Episodes 21, 25, and 26 do not contain any Evil Con Carne segments. The entire second and final season was eventually released in October 2017 on Cartoon Network on Demand.

Characters

The Grim Adventures of Billy & Mandy 
 The Grim Reaper (voiced by Greg Eagles): He is over 137,000 years old (as his early childhood took place during the Stone Age) and speaks with a Jamaican accent. The continuity of how Grim got his reaper status and powers jumps around quite a few times and it is unknown which way he really got his powers (for example, in The Spider Queen, he was elected to his position as the Grim Reaper while he was in middle school; however, in "A Grim Prophecy", it is shown that he was the Grim Reaper since his childhood with his parents forcing him to be the Reaper, which is revealed to be all a dream and further contradicted in a later episode where he is seen stumbling over his scythe to become Grim Reaper). His scythe is the source of his powers and possesses many magical qualities; although he is still capable of using magic without it, these instances are quite rare.
 Billy (voiced by Richard Horvitz): He is an 8-year-old happy-go-lucky child with an extremely low IQ of −5. He was outperformed by a shovel and a candy necklace on an IQ test. He has an extremely large, pink nose, wears a blue and white striped shirt, and covers his orange hair with a red hat. His main affiliations are Grim and Mandy. Mandy is Billy's best friend, though she treats him more like a servant than a friend. It has been hinted several times that Billy may have underlying feelings for Mandy that even he (in his stupidity) may not fully realize. Billy is definitely kinder to Grim than Mandy is, and while he may go against the Reaper's advice and use him as a plaything, he appears to genuinely like him. Of the two children, Billy is the one who most often tells Grim that he is his "best friend".
 Mandy (voiced by Grey DeLisle): She is a girl about Billy's age who has (mostly) a morbid, cynical and merciless attitude. However, unlike Billy, she is more stable, sane and intelligent. She hates everything, especially unicorns. She will punch or otherwise injure (physically, emotionally, mentally or any combination of the three) anyone who gets in her way. She is Billy's "best friend" regardless of the awful way she treats him. She is known for rarely smiling; the one occasion on which this happens, it causes reality to fall apart. She orders Grim and Billy to do chores for her, among a slew of other grunt work. She is naturally hostile and cynical and is shown in one episode to have physical difficulty saying the word "please". She never smiles, except in "Meet the Reaper", "Opposite Day", "Look Alive!", "A Dumb Wish", "Something Stupid This Way Comes", "Dream A Little Dream", "Crushed", and "Mandy the Merciless" where she does crack a smile.

Evil Con Carne 
 Hector Con Carne (voiced by Phil LaMarr): He is a dynamic, evil playboy type, reduced to an anthropomorphic brain and a stomach after a gigantic explosion. Somehow, the stomach has taken on a life of its own. He is often frustrated by the difficulty of taking over the world in its current state.
 Major Dr. Ghastly (voiced by Grey DeLisle): A mad scientist, Ghastly is the brains behind all Hector's plans. Ghastly really does not seem to be intent on taking over the world; she does get more interested in inventing things and getting closer to Hector.
 General Skarr (voiced by Armin Shimerman): Con Carne's paramilitary leader. He is a cold-hearted, hateful and harsh man, with a scar on his face, and one eye. He tends to be more evil than Con Carne himself, many times trying to overthrow his leader. He has made several appearances on Maxwell Atoms' other show, "The Grim Adventures of Billy & Mandy", as Billy's next-door neighbor. He has also starred in the Billy & Mandy spin-off, Underfist. Skarr seems to resemble Fearless Leader, Herr Starr, and General Armin Skull. It has been stated that he quit working for Hector Con Carne after they were "bought out" by the cartoon industry because they did not want the competition in world domination.
 Boskov (voiced by Frank Welker): A former Russian circus bear, Boskov carries both of Hector's brain and stomach on his body, via metal plates on said spots. He is usually controlled by Hector and seems to care for everyone around him. He is sometimes difficult to control due to his animal instincts and lack of intelligence.
 Stomach (voiced by Armin Shimerman): This former stomach of Hector Con Carne will only talk if it is about food.

Broadcast history

Home media 
Various episodes originating from Grim & Evil have been released on DVD. The Billy & Mandy short "Son of Nergal" was released as part of the 2004 DVD release of Cartoon Network Christmas Yuletide Follies, and its other short "Battle of the Bands" was released as part of the 2005 DVD release of Cartoon Network: Christmas Rocks; both of which had the intro and end credits from Grim & Evil. Most of the Billy & Mandy shorts originating from Grim & Evil were released as part of The Grim Adventures of Billy & Mandy: Season 1 DVD in 2007. Six Evil Con Carne shorts were included in the DVD as special features.

Other releases including The Grim Adventures of Billy & Mandy season one/Grim & Evil episodes:
 "Billy and Mandy's Jacked-Up Halloween" – Cartoon Network Halloween: 9 Creepy Cartoon Capers (August 10, 2004)
 "Night of the Living Grim" – Cartoon Network Halloween 2: Grossest Halloween Ever (August 9, 2005)
 "Crushed!" – Codename: Kids Next Door: Sooper Hugest Missions: File Two (August 23, 2005)

The entire series of Grim & Evil was officially available on Cartoon Network on Demand from October 2017 until 2019.

Notes

References

External links 

The Grim Adventures of Billy & Mandy
2000s American animated television series
2001 American television series debuts
2004 American television series endings
American children's animated comedy television series
American children's animated horror television series
Autism in television
Cartoon Cartoons
English-language television shows
Television series by Cartoon Network Studios
Television series created by Maxwell Atoms
Television shows set in the United States